The Ihlen Declaration was a statement made on 22 July 1919 by the Foreign minister of Norway, Nils Claus Ihlen, on the topic of Denmark's sovereignty over Greenland, in which Ihlen declared verbally to the Danish Minister that "...the plans of the Royal [Danish] Government respecting Danish sovereignty over the whole of Greenland...would be met with no difficulties on the part of Norway." The declaration became an issue when the question was raised whether the statement was binding on Norway. The question eventually went all the way to the Permanent Court of International Justice in the form of the Eastern Greenland Case in 1933.

The declaration

In a meeting, Denmark agreed not to object to any claim to Spitsbergen which Norway might submit at an upcoming peace conference, if Norway would not oppose the Danish claim at the same conference to the whole of Greenland. This was on 4 July 1919. At the time, Norway occupied certain parts of East Greenland.

In response, Ihlen made the declaration on 22 July 1919 that "...the plans of the Royal [Danish] Government respecting Danish sovereignty over the whole of Greenland...would be met with no difficulties on the part of Norway."

Eastern Greenland Case

However, Norway continued to occupy East Greenland into the 1930s. This led Denmark and Norway to agree to take the case to the Permanent Court of International Justice in 1933. This led to several questions: Are affirmations made by one government to another binding? Was the declaration valid if it was made in violation of Norwegian municipal law article 46 - invalidity (article 27 - observance) of the Norwegian Constitution requiring consent by the Norwegian Parliament to enter into a treaty? Should Denmark have known that assent by the Norwegian Parliament was needed to make a treaty?

The International Court at the Hague awarded the disputed territory to Denmark. The Court declared that the Ihlen declaration constituted an unconditional and definitive promise. The decision was accepted by both countries.

References

1919 in Greenland
1919 in international relations
1919 in Norway
History of Greenland
1919 in Denmark
1919 documents
International law
Permanent Court of International Justice cases
Denmark–Norway relations